Jikirum Adjaluddin (January 11, 1912 – April 1, 1938) was a Filipino swimmer who competed at the 1932 and 1936 Summer Olympics.

Adjaluddin was the only Southeast Asian to qualify for the semifinals of more than one event until the 2016 Summer Olympics when Singaporean Joseph Schooling and Quah Zheng Wen qualified for the semifinals in two events each.

Career 
Jikirum Adjaluddin finished in 5th place at the 10th Olympic Games in Los Angeles, California in 1932. He made it to the finals of the Men’s 200m Breaststroke event.

While at the 11th Olympic Games in Berlin, Germany in 1936, Jikirum Adjaluddin made it to the semifinal round of the Men’s 100m Free and 200m Breaststroke events where he finished 11th and 12th.

References

External links
 

1912 births
1938 deaths
Filipino male swimmers
Swimmers at the 1932 Summer Olympics
Swimmers at the 1936 Summer Olympics
People from Sulu
Olympic swimmers of the Philippines
Filipino Muslims
20th-century Filipino people